David Lloyd Hemp (born 8 November 1970) is a former Bermudian cricketer. He is a left-handed batsman and a right-arm medium-pace bowler, who has played domestic cricket for Glamorgan, Free State, and Warwickshire. David has a younger brother, Tim, who has previously played for Glamorgan's second eleven, and who appeared for Wales Minor Counties in the NatWest Trophy. David Hemp has also played List A and Twenty20 cricket. He is currently Head coach of Pakistan Women Cricket Team. He attended Millfield School.

County cricket
Hemp first appeared for Glamorgan in 1991, and was part of the Glamorgan side which won the 1993 Sunday League championship. He followed this up in 1994/95 when he went on a tour with the England A team to India and Bangladesh. The following season, he made a career high 157, before joining Warwickshire in 1997. He quickly made it into the top order, and played there consistently until he made a return to Glamorgan in 2002.

Having set a record for Glamorgan with a 251 second-wicket partnership, he also played in the match against Kent at Canterbury which won Glamorgan the Norwich Union League.

On 12 September 2006, he assumed the captaincy of Glamorgan with immediate effect after the resignation of Robert Croft. At the end of the 2008 season, he was released by the club.

International cricket
In November 2006, Hemp made his debut for Bermuda, the country of his birth, in an ICC Intercontinental Cup game against Kenya. He went on to represent them in all games on their African tour, including seven One Day Internationals against Kenya, Canada and the Netherlands. The undoubted highlight of this tour was the Intercontinental Cup match against the Netherlands, in which Hemp scored an unbeaten 247, his highest first-class innings. At the time, this was the highest score in the history of the competition, but the record stood only until the Netherlands' next match, when Ryan ten Doeschate scored 259 not out.

His current top ODI score came during the qualifiers for the 2011 World Cup, as he hit 102 not out during Bermuda's loss to Kenya. His previous best, 76 not out against India at the 2007 World Cup, was the first-ever fifty scored by a Bermuda player in the World Cup.  As Bermuda have not since returned to the tournament, it remains the highest score made by a Bermuda player in the World Cup, and he remains the country's highest aggregate run-scorer in the tournament.

Coaching career
In October 2020, he appointed as head coach of the Pakistan women's national cricket team.

References

External links

Article on Hemp's record breaking innings

1970 births
Living people
People from Hamilton, Bermuda
Glamorgan cricketers
Glamorgan cricket captains
Bermudian cricketers
Bermuda One Day International cricketers
Bermuda Twenty20 International cricketers
Free State cricketers
Warwickshire cricketers
Cricketers at the 2007 Cricket World Cup
People educated at Olchfa School
Wales National County cricketers
Bermuda cricket captains
Alumni of the University of Birmingham
Bermudian cricket coaches
First-Class Counties Select XI cricketers
People educated at Millfield